Ahmed Al-Sultan (born 22 July 1993) is a Saudi footballer who plays a midfielder for Saudi Arabian club Al-Adalah.

References

1993 births
Living people
Saudi Arabian footballers
Association football midfielders
Al-Fateh SC players
Al-Diriyah Club players
Damac FC players
Al-Adalah FC players
Saudi First Division League players
Saudi Professional League players
Saudi Arabian Shia Muslims